Frederick A. Ballen (August 11, 1843 – April 27, 1916) was a German soldier who received the Medal of Honor for valor during the American Civil War.

Biography
Archer served in the American Civil War in the 47th Ohio Infantry for the Union Army. He received the Medal of Honor on November 6, 1908 for his actions at Vicksburg, Mississippi.

Medal of Honor citation
Citation:

Was one of a party that volunteered and attempted to run the enemy's batteries with a steam tug and 2 barges loaded with subsistence stores.

See also

List of American Civil War Medal of Honor recipients: A-F

Notes

External links

Military Times

1843 births
1916 deaths
Union Army soldiers
United States Army Medal of Honor recipients
German-born Medal of Honor recipients
German emigrants to the United States
People of Ohio in the American Civil War
American Civil War recipients of the Medal of Honor